Donauwörth is a town and the capital of the Donau-Ries district in Swabia, Bavaria, Germany. It is said to have been founded by two fishermen where the rivers Danube (Donau) and Wörnitz meet. The city is part of the scenic route called "Romantische Straße" (Romantic Road).

The city is situated between Munich and Nuremberg, 46 km north of Augsburg.

History
Donauwörth grew up in the course of the 11th and 12th centuries under the protection of the castle of Mangoldstein, became in the 13th century a seat of Duke Ludwig II of Bavaria, who, however, soon withdrew to Munich to escape from his wife, Duchess Maria of Brabant, whom he had there beheaded on an unfounded suspicion of infidelity. The town received the freedom of the Holy Roman Empire in 1308, and maintained its position in spite of the encroachments of Bavaria till 1607, when the interference of the Protestant inhabitants with the abbot of the Heilig-Kreuz called forth an imperial law authorizing the duke of Bavaria to punish them for the offence.

It is historically important to Germany as the site of one of the incidents which led to the Thirty Years' War (1618–1648). In 1606, the Lutheran majority barred the Catholic Church residents of the town from holding an annual Markus procession, causing a riot to break out. During the war, it was stormed by Gustavus Adolphus (1632) and captured by Ferdinand III (1634).

Donauwörth was later the scene of the Battle of Schellenberg (or Battle of Donauwörth) on 2 July 1704, during the War of the Spanish Succession (1702–1713). The battle was named after the village and high ground behind the city. John Churchill, 1st Duke of Marlborough, was marching from Flanders to Bavaria and came to the Danube. The French decided to make a crossing of the Danube at Donauwörth, where they were surprised by Marlborough's troops and after heavy fighting pulled back. That allowed Marlborough to capture Donauwörth and cross the Danube without any problem. Another battle of Donauwörth on 7 October 1805 opened Napoleon's Ulm campaign.

Notable citizens

1291–1351 Margareta Ebner, German mystic
1499–1543 Sebastian Franck, was a 16th-century German freethinker, humanist, and radical reformer
1838–1912 Franz Hartmann, theosophist, occultist, geomancer, astrologer and author. 
1848–1934 Michael Deffner, philologist and archaeologist
1861–1933 Ferdinand Bonn, stage and film actor 
1901–1983 Werner Egk, composer
1942 Werner Schnitzer, actor
1948 Manfred G. Schmidt, professor of political science
1980 Carolin Hingst, pole vaulter
1980 Sercan Güvenışık, footballer

Twin towns — sister cities

Donauwörth is twinned with:
 Perchtoldsdorf, Austria

See also
 Danube

References

External links
 
 Official website

Populated places on the Danube
Free imperial cities
Donau-Ries